Giorgio Bertin  (born 28 December 1946) is an Italian bishop of the Catholic Church who has been the Bishop of Djibouti since 2001 and the Apostolic Administrator of the Diocese of Mogadishu in Somalia since 1990.

Early life 
Bertin was born on 28 December 1946 in Galzignano Terme, Veneto in the Kingdom of Italy. He entered the Order of Friars Minor on 10 September 1967, joining their Province of Saint Charles Borromeo. He completed his high school studies in Milan and then obtained Bachelor of Sacred Theology degree. He professed his solemn vows in 1972 and was ordained a priest on 7 June 1975.

He studied at the Pontifical Institute of Arab and Islamic Studies from 1975 to 1977 and earned a Licentiate in Arabic and Islamic Studies.

Missionary in Africa 
Bertin became a missionary to Somalia and was assigned as a parish priest at the Mogadishu Cathedral from 1978 to 1983. From 1978 to 1985, he was also the director Caritas in Mogadishu, and from 1985 to 1988, he was the director of Caritas Somalia. In 1984, Bertin became the vicar general of the Diocese of Mogadishu, holding this position until 1989. He was a professor of Latin at the Consular Italian School in Mogadishu from 1986 to 1989, and from 1989 to 1990, he was the president of Caritas Somalia.

Bertin became the diocesan administrator of the Diocese of Mogadishu in 1989. Following the assassination of the Bishop of Mogadishu, Salvatore Colombo, in 1991, Bertin was made the apostolic administrator of the diocese.

Bertin was appointed the Bishop of Djibouti by Pope John Paul II on 4 April 2001.

References

External links 
 

Living people
1946 births
People from the Province of Padua
Pontifical Institute of Arab and Islamic Studies alumni
21st-century Italian Roman Catholic bishops
Roman Catholic bishops of Djibouti